The shining parrots, Prosopeia, are a genus of parrots in the family Psittaculidae.

The genus is endemic to the islands of Fiji, although one species, the maroon shining parrot, has been introduced to Tonga. The three species are also sometimes known as musk parrots.

The shining-parrots have long tails, a languid crow-like flight and very bright plumage.

Taxonomy
The genus Prosopeia was introduced in 1854 by the French naturalist Charles Lucien Bonaparte to accommodate a single species, the masked shining parrot. The genus name is from the Ancient Greek prosōpeion meaning "mask". The genus now contains three species:

See also

References

 
Endemic birds of Fiji
Parrots of Oceania
Psittacidae
Taxa named by Charles Lucien Bonaparte
Taxonomy articles created by Polbot